Armand Joel Banaken Bassoken (26 November 1983 – 3 January 2023) was a Cameroonian footballer who played as a centre-back. Banaken previously played for Persitara North Jakarta. 

On 3 January 2023, he died in a motorcycle collision, at the age of 39.

Reference

External links 
 Profile at liga-indonesia.co.id

1983 births
2023 deaths 
Road incident deaths in Indonesia 
Motorcycle road incident deaths
Cameroonian footballers
Association football central defenders
union Douala players
les Astres players
Persewangi Banyuwangi players
Persitara Jakarta Utara players
PSPS Pekanbaru players
Persijap Jepara players
Cameroonian expatriate footballers
Cameroonian expatriate sportspeople in Indonesia
Expatriate footballers in Indonesia